Alangudi Vanganar (Tamil: ஆலங்குடி வங்கனார்) was a poet of the Sangam period, to whom 8 verses of the Sangam literature have been attributed, including verse 53 of the Tiruvalluva Maalai.

Biography
Alangudi Vanganar hailed from Alangudi in Pudukottai district in Tamil Nadu. He was said to be involved in maritime trade and hence acquired the name 'Vanganar', which means the one related to ships.

Contribution to the Sangam literature
Alangudi Vanganar has written 8 verses, including 2 in Kurunthogai, 3 in Natrinai, 1 each in Agananuru and Purananuru, and 1 in Tiruvalluva Maalai.

Views on Valluvar and the Kural
Alangudi Vanganar opines about Valluvar and the Kural text thus:

See also

 Sangam literature
 List of Sangam poets
 Tiruvalluva Maalai

Notes

References

 

Tamil philosophy
Tamil poets
Sangam poets
Tiruvalluva Maalai contributors